There are currently no operational railways in South Georgia and the South Sandwich Islands..  However, small industrial railways operated on the quayside of certain ports in South Georgia, to support the whaling industries in the early 20th century, and some of their remains are still present.  Most of these were cable railways hauled by fixed steam engines or sometimes manpowered.  The railway at Ocean Harbour is the only one definitely known to have used locomotives, but there may have been others.  The rusting remains of an 0-4-0 narrow gauge locomotive is still present at Ocean Harbour.  A light railway was also provided at the scientific station of Discovery House during its establishment in 1923–1925.

Railway use began to decline in South Georgia when tractor imports became common in the 1950s.  The switch from coal to oil as the fuel running the machinery and generators at the stations may also have been significant.  Coal was the bulk of the material that needed transportation.  Oil, on the other hand, can be piped to its destination.  The body of Ernest Shackleton was carried on the Grytviken light railway when it was taken there for burial in 1922.

List of rail systems

South Georgia

South Sandwich Islands 
A survey station in Southern Thule may transport equipment using the round cross-section rails as used for tracking shots in cinematography.  There are otherwise no light railways in the South Sandwich Islands.  Southern Thule is a long way south at 59°25′S, but even if its track is counted as a proper light railway, it is not the most southerly ever built.  That record is held by the Dumont d'Urville Station in Antarctica at 66°40'S where a narrow gauge track is used to unload material at the jetty.

References

Further reading 
 Fraser, Gibbie, Shetland's Whalers Remembered, Lerwick: Gilbert A. Fraser, 2001 .

Narrow gauge railways in South America
South Georgia and the South Sandwich Islands